Spyridon P. Chazapis (1872, in Andros – ?) was a Greek swimmer.  He competed at the 1896 Summer Olympics in Athens. Chazapis competed in the 100 metres freestyle for sailors event.  He placed second of the three swimmers.

References

External links

1872 births
Year of death missing
Greek male swimmers
Swimmers at the 1896 Summer Olympics
19th-century sportsmen
Olympic swimmers of Greece
Olympic silver medalists for Greece
People from Andros
Medalists at the 1896 Summer Olympics
Olympic silver medalists in swimming
Greek male freestyle swimmers
Sportspeople from the South Aegean
Date of birth missing
Place of death missing